Epilogue is an EP recording by the Blake Babies, released in 2002 (see 2002 in music).  This is the final release from the band before their break up.

Track listing

"Walk A Thin Line" - 3:16 (Lindsey Buckingham)
"Shakin' Street" - 2:16 (Fred "Sonic" Smith, Wayne Kramer, Dennis Thompson, Rob Tyner, Michael Davis)
"I Wanna Be Sedated" -  3:58 (Joey Ramone)
"My Motor" - 2:44 (Juliana Hatfield, John Strohm)
"Nothing Ever Happens" (Remix) - 2:55 (Freda Love Smith) remixed by Peter DuCharme

Personnel
Juliana Hatfield - vocals, guitars and bass
John Strohm - guitars, bass and backing vocals
Freda Love Smith - drums
Brian Brown - tambourine

Production
Producer: Blake Babies and Paul Mahern
Engineer: Brian Brown and Paul Mahern

Blake Babies albums
2002 EPs